The Stephen and Parthena M. Blank House, also known as the Old Stagecoach Stop, is a historic residence located in Forest Grove, Oregon, United States. Built in 1858 or 1859, it is one of Forest Grove's distinctive examples of mid-19th century Greek Revival architecture. Gradual extensions of the structure from the 1850s to the 1880s employed multiple frame construction methods; the house particularly exhibits clear remnants of the balloon-frame and box-frame techniques of the period. Oral tradition suggests that the house was also used as an overnight stagecoach inn on the route between Portland and Tillamook in the late 19th or early 20th century. It was listed on the National Register of Historic Places in 1988.

See also
Alvin T. Smith House
National Register of Historic Places listings in Washington County, Oregon

References

External links

1858 establishments in Oregon Territory
Buildings and structures in Forest Grove, Oregon
Greek Revival houses in Oregon
Historic district contributing properties in Oregon
Houses completed in 1858
Houses in Washington County, Oregon
Houses on the National Register of Historic Places in Oregon
National Register of Historic Places in Washington County, Oregon